Kharyyalakh (Xarıyalaax) is a rural locality (a selo) in Odununsky Rural Okrug of Gorny District in the Sakha Republic, Russia, located  from Berdigestyakh, the administrative center of the district and  from Magaras, the administrative center of the rural okrug. Its population as of the 2002 Census was 7.

References

Notes

Sources
Official website of the Sakha Republic. Registry of the Administrative-Territorial Divisions of the Sakha Republic. Gorny District. 

Rural localities in Gorny District